Vladimir Kravchenko (Russian: Владимир Казимирович Кравченко; born 12 June 1964) is a Russian politician serving as a senator from the Legislative Duma of Tomsk Oblast since 14 October 2021.

Vladimir Kravchenko is under personal sanction introduced by the European Union, the United Kingdom, the USA, Canada, Switzerland, Australia, Ukraine, New Zealand, for ratifying the decisions of the "Treaty of Friendship, Cooperation and Mutual Assistance between the Russian Federation and the Donetsk People's Republic and between the Russian Federation and the Luhansk People's Republic" and providing political and economic support for Russia's annexation of Ukrainian territories.

Biography

Vladimir Kravchenko was born on 12 June 1964 in Moscow. In 1985, he graduated from the Tomsk State Pedagogical University. In 2002, he also received a degree from the 
Tomsk State Pedagogical University. Right after the first degree, Kravchenko started working as a physical education teacher in Tomsk Oblast. Later, he also served in the Soviet Army. From 1989 to 1996, he was the primary organizer of the Tomsk military-patriotic club. Afterward, Kravchenko also chaired the Russian Union of Veterans of Afghanistan. In 2000, he participated in the creation of the Tomsk regional branch of the Unity party. For more than ten years, he also headed the local branch of the United Russia party. From 2007 to 2016, he was the deputy of the Legislative Duma of Tomsk Oblast of the 4th, 5th, and 6th convocations. On 7 October 2016, he became the senator from the Legislative Duma of Tomsk Oblast. In 2021, he was re-elected for the same position.

References

Living people
1964 births
United Russia politicians
21st-century Russian politicians
Members of the Federation Council of Russia (after 2000)